The Ministry of Social and Family Development (MSF; ;) is a ministry of the Government of Singapore responsible for the formulation and implementation of policies related to the community infrastructure, programmes and services in Singapore.

History 

MSF was formed on 1 November 2012, after it was announced on 31 July 2012 that the Ministry of Community Development, Youth and Sports would be restructured. Several portfolios, including youth and sports development, charity governance and REACH, the Government's feedback unit, were taken over by two other new Ministries - Ministry of Culture, Community and Youth and Ministry of Communications and Information.

Responsibilities
One of MSF's immediate priorities was to re-examine public policies to help get Singaporeans to marry and have their first child earlier. In addition, MSF would work on strengthening the social safety net to better help those in need, especially those who are at risk.

Statutory Boards

Early Childhood Development Agency
National Council of Social Service
National Council on Problem Gambling

Impact 
In June 2018, the Save The Children organisation's End of Childhood report ranked Singapore as the best country for children to grow up in. Its ranking methodology is based on eight indicators - under-five mortality rate, child stunting, out-of-school children and youth, child labour, child marriage, adolescent birth rate, child homicide rate and population displaced by conflict.

Ministers 

The Ministry is headed by the Minister for Social and Family Development, who is appointed as part of the Cabinet of Singapore. The incumbent minister is Masagos Zulkifli from the People's Action Party.

References

External links

Singapore Government Directory Interactive — Ministry of Social and Family Development

2012 establishments in Singapore
Gender equality ministries
Singapore
Women's ministries
Social and Family Development
Organisations of the Singapore Government
Ministries established in 2012
Women in Singapore
Women's rights in Singapore

ru:Министерство общественного развития, молодежи и спорта Сингапура